Walter Fairbanks (13 April 1852 – 25 August 1924) was an English cricketer. He played for Gloucestershire between 1875 and 1884. Fairbanks was educated at Clifton College and Clare College, Cambridge. After graduating he returned to Clifton College and taught there 1875–96.

References

1852 births
1924 deaths
English cricketers
Gloucestershire cricketers
Sportspeople from Chatham, Kent
Cambridge University cricketers
Non-international England cricketers
People educated at Clifton College
Alumni of Clare College, Cambridge
Schoolteachers from Somerset